Pilda Parish is an administrative unit of Ludza Municipality, Latvia. It is also one of the rare places where people have some knowledge of the Ludza dialect

Towns, villages and settlements of Pilda Parish 
Lielie Tjapši

References

Parishes of Latvia
Ludza Municipality